Aknoor is a village panchayat in Cherial mandal in Siddipet district in the state of Telangana in south India.  It was formerly in Andhra Pradesh.

References 

Villages in Hanamkonda district